The 1968 Florida Gators football team represented the University of Florida during the 1968 NCAA University Division football season. The season was Ray Graves' ninth of ten years as the head coach of the Florida Gators football team.  The Gators offense was led by senior tailback Larry Smith, a first-team All-American.  Among the season's highlights were the Gators' conference wins over the Mississippi State Bulldogs (31–14), Tulane Green Wave (24–7) and Kentucky Wildcats (16–14), and victories over the in-state rival Florida State Seminoles (9–3) and Miami Hurricanes (14–10).  The Gators also suffered their worst loss since 1942—a 51–0 blowout by the Georgia Bulldogs.  Graves' 1968 Florida Gators finished 6–3–1 overall and 3–2–1 in the Southeastern Conference (SEC), tying for sixth among the ten teams of the SEC.

Schedule

Primary source: 2015 Florida Gators Football Media Guide

Attendance figures: 1968 University of Florida Football Brochure.

Personnel

Team players in the NFL

References

Florida
Florida Gators football seasons
Florida Gators football